Whitman Ashby Barber (October 17, 1853 – February 23, 1930) was an American businessman and politician.

Born on a farm in the town of Lyndon, near Waldo, Sheboygan County, Wisconsin, Barber went to Ripon College, for one year, and then taught school in Silver Creek, Wisconsin. In 1874, Barber was appointed United States gauger. Barber worked for the Waldo Canning Company, as manager, and was president of the Twin Buttes Mining and Smelting Company. Barber served as chairman and assessor of the Town of Lyndon. In 1899, Barber served in the Wisconsin State Assembly and was a Republican. Barber died at his home in Waldo, Wisconsin.

Notes

1853 births
1930 deaths
People from Lyndon, Sheboygan County, Wisconsin
Ripon College (Wisconsin) alumni
Businesspeople from Wisconsin
Educators from Wisconsin
Mayors of places in Wisconsin
Republican Party members of the Wisconsin State Assembly
People from Waldo, Wisconsin